Felipe dos Anjos de Paula Gama (born April 30, 1998) is a Brazilian professional basketball player.

Early career 
Dos Anjos came through the youth ranks of Esporte Clube Pinheiros, in his native Brazil. In 2012, dos Anjos moved to Spain, joining the youth clubs of Real Madrid. He played in the amateur level, on the club's reserve team, in the Spanish EBA League, which is Spain's 4th Division, during the 2014–15 and 2015–16 campaigns.

He helped Real's under-18 team win the Adidas Next Generation Tournament, in 2015. In January 2016, he was named the most valuable player of the Adidas Next Generation Tournament qualifiers, in L'Hospitalet. The next month, he attended the Basketball Without Borders Global Camp, in Toronto.

In April 2017, he participated in the Nike Hoop Summit. Coming off the bench for the World Select Team, dos Anjos remained scoreless in eight minutes of play.

Professional career 
For the 2016–17 season, dos Anjos was sent on loan to Union Financiera Baloncesto Oviedo of the second Spanish division, LEB Oro, where he averaged 8.4 points and 6.0 rebounds per game.

On 15 August 2017, Real Madrid loaned him to San Pablo Burgos, for the 2017–18 season, where he made his debut in the Spanish top division, Liga ACB.

On 22 July 2020, dos Anjos signed with RETAbet Bilbao Basket.

On 9 August 2021, dos Anjos signed with Movistar Estudiantes.

References

External links 
 Felipe Dos Anjos at acb.com 
 Felipe Dos Anjos at competiciones.feb.es 
 Felipe Dos Anjos at fiba.com
 Felipe Dos Anjos at eurobasket.com
 Felipe Dos Anjos at draftexpress.com
 Felipe Dos Anjos at realmadrid.com 

1998 births
Living people
Brazilian expatriate basketball people in Spain
Brazilian men's basketball players
CB Miraflores players
Centers (basketball)
Club Melilla Baloncesto players
Liga ACB players
Oviedo CB players
Basketball players from São Paulo